The Edmond Machtens Stadium is a football stadium located in the municipality of Molenbeek-Saint-Jean in Brussels, Belgium. The stadium has a capacity of 12,266. 

It was the home of Belgian Second Division club FC Molenbeek Brussels Strombeek from the 2003 merger between R White Daring Molenbeek and KFC Strombeek to its dissolution in 2014. Prior to this it has been the home of R White Daring Molenbeek and of R Daring Club de Bruxelles. Since 2015 when it was formed, it is the home of phoenix club RWDM47.

It is named after Edmond Machtens, a former mayor of Molenbeek-Saint-Jean between 1939 and 1978. The stadium was formerly known as the Oscar Bossaert Stadium and has hosted a number of matches of the Belgium national football team during the 1920s, as well as a friendly game against France in 1945. Oscar Bossaert was a former Daring Club de Bruxelles player and industrialist.

The stadium comprises three stands: one behind a goal with only stand-up places, and the other two are seated and located along the ground.  Behind the second goal is a tree row that darkens the field in a special way.  There are also 622 places in the business-seats.  In 2005 the stand 2 was renamed stand Raymond Goethals in memory of the former player.

References

Football venues in Brussels
Molenbeek-Saint-Jean
R.W.D. Molenbeek
R.W.D.M. Brussels F.C.